Cromarty is a rural locality in the Shire of Burdekin, Queensland, Australia.

History 
The locality was named and bounded on 27 July 1991.

References 

Shire of Burdekin
Localities in Queensland